= Buryat =

Buryat or Buriat may refer to:

- Buryats, a Mongol people
- Buryat language, a Mongolic language
- Buryatia, also known as the "Buryat Republic", a federal subject of Russia
